Mirian Silva da Paixão (born 25 February 1982), simply known as Mirian, is a Brazilian professional footballer who plays as a goalkeeper for JC Futebol Clube.

Career
Mirian was part of the Equatorial Guinea women's national football team at the 2011 FIFA Women's World Cup. She started all the three matches Equatorial Guinea played in the competition. The "Nzalang Nacional" ended losing all the matches they played in the group stage and didn't qualify for the World Cup's knockout stage. This was the only time, to date, the team played the competition. The squad was filled with Brazilian-born players (9 in total) and a FIFA posterior investigation found the "Equatorial Guinea Football Association liable for the use of forged or falsified documents", banning them from competing at the 2019 FIFA Women's World Cup and the 2020 Summer Olympics. Moreover, on October 5, 2017, FIFA declared Mirian and other nine Brazilian footballers ineligible to play for Equatorial Guinea.

References

1982 births
Living people
Sportspeople from Bahia
Brazilian women's footballers
Women's association football goalkeepers
Campeonato Brasileiro de Futebol Feminino Série A1 players

Equatorial Guinea women's international footballers
2011 FIFA Women's World Cup players